Şehzade Ibrahim Tevfik Efendi (6November 1874 – 31 December 1931) was an Ottoman prince, the son of Şehzade Mehmed Burhaneddin, and grandson of Sultan Abdulmejid I.

Early life
Şehzade Ibrahim Tevfik was born on 6 November 1874 in the Dolmabahçe Palace.
 His father was Şehzade Mehmed Burhaneddin son of Abdulmejid I and Nükhetsezâ Hanım, and his mother was Mestinaz Hanım. He had a younger sister, who died at age of four. After his father's death in 1876, Sultan Abdul Hamid II brought him up in his care. For several years he believed the sultan to be his real father.

His circumcision took place on 17 December 1883, together with Şehzade Mehmed Selim, eldest son of Sultan Abdul Hamid, Abdulmejid II, Şehzade Mehmed Şevket and Şehzade Mehmed Seyfeddin, sons of Sultan Abdulaziz, and Şehzade Mehmed Ziyaeddin, son of Sultan Mehmed V.

Education and career
In 1880, he began his schooling. His teacher was Eyüp Efendi. His subjects included morphology of Arabic, etiquettes, catechism, orthography, arithmetic, geography, geometry, cosmography, astronomy, French language, Islamic history, and ethical admonitions of Attar. Mehmed Eşref taught him Arabic, fiqh, and aqidah. Aranda Efendi taught him music.

In 1878, he was registered in the navy. In August 1883, he was given the rank of right wing lieutenant commander, and went on to become vice admiral. He was also appointed in the marine and in the imperial fire-fighting battalion. By 1918, he was serving as honorary brigadier in the Ottoman infantry.

Personal life
Tevfik had been allocated a villa on the grounds of the Yıldız Palace. He also owned a waterside mansion in Beşiktaş. Here he bred various animals like dogs, parrots and lambs.

He married five times and had seven children. His first wife was Fevziye  Hanım. She was born on 5 August 1876 in Batumi, Adjara. She was an Abkhazian. They married on 2 May 1893 in the Yıldız Palace. In 1895, some two years later, she gave birth to Arife Kadriye Sultan. She died on 7 September 1898 in the Yıldız Palace.

His second wife was Tesrid Hanım. She was born on 10 September 1874 in Poti, Abkhazia. Her father was either named Ömer Bey, or Mehmed Bey. She was the sister of Emsalinur Kadın, wife of Sultan Abdul Hamid II. They married on 12 March 1894 in the Yıldız Palace. In 1895, she gave birth to Fatma Zehra Sultan. She died on 1945 in Beşiktaş, Istanbul.

His third wife was Emine Hanım. She was born on 28 October 1890 in Adapazarı, Istanbul. They married on 5 May 1911 in the Ortaköy Palace. In 1912, she gave birth to Rabia Nilüfer Sultan, followed by Ayşe Masume Fethiye Sultan in 1916. They divorced on 23 April 1916. Following the divorce, Emine and her daughters first settled with Sultan Mehmed VI, and later with Caliph Abdulmejid II. She died on 14 February 1953 in Beşiktaş, Istanbul.

His fourth wife was Hatice Şadiye Hanım. She was born on 1 April 1898 in Kabataş, Istanbul. She was the daughter of Çürüksulu Süleyman Bahri Pasha Tavdgiridze and Hatice Hanım. They married on 27 March 1919 in the Beşiktaş Palace. In 1920, she gave birth to Şehzade Burhaneddin Cem, followed by Şehzade Bayezid Osman in 1924. They divorced in 1930. Following her divorce, Şadiye met American businessman William Thallon Daus in Paris. They married in 1932, and had two sons, Rudolph Halouk and Bahri Lawrence. She died on 9 August 1986.

His fifth wife was Hayriye Hanım. She was born in 1914. She was a Bosnian. They married in 1927. In 1928, she gave birth to Fevziye Sultan. In 1930, she entrusted her daughter to Şehzade Ömer Faruk and Sabiha Sultan, and went to live in with another relative. In 1931, after Tevfik's death, she came back to Nice, took her daughter, and went first to Paris, and then to Egypt, where she married a Tatar by the name of Seyfulin Bey, who brought up Fevziye as if she were his own daughter. She died on 4 August 2001 in Paris, France, and was buried in Muslim cemetery in Thiais, Val-de-Marne, France.

Later life and death
In March 1920, following the Occupation of Constantinople, Tevfik and one of his wives were arrested by the British in order to threat the Ottoman dynasty.

At the exile of the imperial family in March 1924, Tevfik settled in France with his two wives, three children and servants. His two daughters, who had already been married, were also exiled. The trustee assigned to sell all the properties the Ottoman dynasty left behind in Turkey betrayed them. He sold the properties, but he spent the money himself, putting Tevfik and his family in a very difficult financial situation.

Tevfik first moved to Paris with his family. They settled in a hotel in Champs-Élysées, where they lived for some time. Then they moved to a large apartment. Here his wife Şadiye Hanım led a very extravagant life, which left Tevfik penniless. He then went to live outside in Nice in a village up in the hills in with his last wife Hayriye Hanım.

Although he was a piano virtuoso, Tevfik, who was very shy, could not play his piano to an audience and could only perform his art from behind a curtain. He was offered a position as a concert pianist at the Salle Pleyel in Paris but declined the offer.

Şehzade Ömer Faruk, who was also in financial trouble, was informed about Tevfik's situation and invited him and his family to his house in Nice, France. He was a quiet and peaceful person, whose presence was barely felt. He only left the house for only one day a week.

He died of a heart attack on 31 December 1931, and was buried in a common grave next to a Christian.

Personality
According to his son Bayezid Osman, he was a sensitive person, known for his delicateness, and someone who didn't care much about money.

Honours

 Order of Distinction, Jeweled
 Order of Osmanieh, Jeweled
 Order of the Medjidie, Jeweled
 Imtiyaz Medal in Silver
 Imtiyaz Medal in Gold
 Liakat War Medal in Gold
 Liakat Medal in Gold

Military appointments

Military ranks and naval appointments
August 1883: Lieutenant-Commander, Ottoman Navy
Vice-Admiral, Ottoman Navy

Honorary military appointments
  1918: Brigadier of the Infantry Regiment, Ottoman Army

Issue

Ancestry

References

Sources

Ottoman princes
1874 births
1931 deaths